"Can't Get You Out of My Mind" is the first single released by Lil Suzy from her fourth album, Paradise. It was released on July 10, 1997. The song reached No. 79 in the Billboard Hot 100 on August 23, 1997.

Tracks
 U.S.A. CD Single

Charts

References

1997 singles
Lil Suzy songs
Eurodance songs
1997 songs